The 1960 Campionatio Italiano was the 3rd season of the Campionato Italiano. Renato Pirocchi won this championship. Many rounds were run in conjunction 1960 Campionatio A.N.P.E.C./Auto Italiana d’Europa (World Car Trophy Italian ANPEC), which saw Colin Davis win the title.

Campionatio Italiano 
Champion:  Renato Pirocchi

Runner Up:  Roberto Lippi

Results

Table

Campionatio A.N.P.E.C./Auto Italiana d’Europa 
Champion:  Colin Davis

Runner Up:  Jacques Calès

Results

Table

References

1960 in Italian motorsport